George Bellew-Bryan, 4th Baron Bellew (1857–1935) was an Irish peer, the son of Edward Joseph Bellew, 2nd Baron Bellew.

Biography
He was born on 22 January 1857.

He fought in the Second Anglo-Afghan War from 1878 to 1879. From 1884 to 1885, he fought in the Nile Expedition. He was appointed 2nd in command of the 5th Battalion, Imperial Yeomanry on 3 February 1900, and fought in the Second Boer War from 1900 to 1901. He became a Lieutenant, then a Major in the 10th Royal Hussars. He later fought in the First World War.

From 1898 to 1911, he served as Lord Lieutenant of Louth in Ireland. In 1911, he became the 4th Baron Bellew, and was elected to sit as an Irish representative peer in the House of Lords.

In 1899, he played in the first international polo match between England and Australia in Melbourne alongside Thomas Brand, 3rd Viscount Hampden.

He married Elaine Carlisle Leach (1885-1973), daughter of John Benjamin Leach, on 9 April 1927. She later became known as Elaine Lady Bellew and served as a City Councillor on the Kilkenny Corporation. He is buried at St Mary Magdalen, Mortlake.

References

External links

1857 births
1935 deaths
British military personnel of the Second Anglo-Afghan War
British Army personnel of the Second Boer War
British Army personnel of World War I
High Sheriffs of County Louth
Lord-Lieutenants of Louth
English polo players
Irish representative peers
Barons in the Peerage of Ireland
Burials at St Mary Magdalen Roman Catholic Church Mortlake